Prince Violent (retitled Prince Varmint for television) is a 1961 Warner Bros. Looney Tunes cartoon directed by Friz Freleng and Freleng's longtime layout artist Hawley Pratt. The short was released on September 2, 1961, and stars Bugs Bunny and Yosemite Sam.

Plot
A Viking named Sam the Terrible is rowing upriver towards a castle, and he is noticed by two people on a nearby riverbank, who quickly retreat to the castle, warning of an invasion. As Sam passes by Bugs Bunny’s hole, Bugs peeks out and thinks that Sam’s outfit is that of an “electric can opener broken loose”. Once he sees Sam entering the castle and forcing the residents to come out, the rabbit takes it upon himself to fight the enemy.

In his first confrontation, Bugs calls Sam’s outfit a Halloween costume, and takes the sword from Sam and dulls it, rendering it useless, before kicking Sam out of the castle. The Viking angrily calls Bugs “Prince Varmint” and tries to re-enter, only to have the horns of his cap get stuck in the castle door. Soon after, Bugs paints a door on the castle walls to trick Sam, who tries to break the “door” down with the help of a pink elephant, only to suddenly knock into some of the stones where the door was painted. Sam berates the pachyderm, who then angrily slams the Viking on the floor with his trunk multiple times.

Next, Sam, with help from the elephant, is catapulting rocks over the castle walls. Bugs sees an opportunity to ruin Sam’s plans by pouring pepper on the elephant, which makes him sneeze a rock right into Sam, flattening him. After that, Bugs asks for the drawbridge to be lowered, thinking that Sam has gone. But Sam reappears and tries to cross the bridge with the elephant, only to break said bridge and fall into the moat.

Sam then decides to try using the elephant’s belly as a boat so as to enter via the back. However, while Sam is sailing, Bugs plugs the elephant’s trunk with a cork. Soon, the pachyderm, in his struggle to breathe, runs back to land, forcing Sam to use his hat to sail back to shore, where he furiously chases away the “stupid pachyderm” (“AND DON’T COME BACK!!! I’ll handle that Prince Varmint myself!”).

Frustrated, Sam tries to mine his way into the castle under one of the towers, only to have the tower pancake onto him. After this attempt fails (“I’m through foolin’ around! Now I’m gonna get serious!”), Sam attempts to blow open the castle door with TNT. When Sam tries to leave, however, the drawbridge has been raised from the other end and the Viking is forced to wait with the lit explosives. After the door blows open, Sam rushes in, only to meet the elephant that he chased away earlier, who proclaims (in a voice mimicking Joe Besser) that he is now on Bugs’ side (“I’m on the GOOD guy’s side now! So take that, bad guy!”), before chasing Sam back to the beach with a club. Furious, Sam vows that he will be coming back to get even with the double-crossing elephant (“YA DOUBLE-CROSSERS! I’m a-comin’ back, and I ain’t comin’ back to play marbles!”) as he escapes on his boat. Bugs comments about what can be accomplished for peanuts (“Y’know, it’s amazing, the things you can accomplish for just peanuts!”), and rewards the elephant with a pack of them as the cartoon fades out.

See also
List of Bugs Bunny cartoons
 List of Yosemite Sam cartoons

References

External links

1961 films
1961 animated films
1961 short films
1960s American animated films
1960s Warner Bros. animated short films
Looney Tunes shorts
Films set in castles
Films set in the Viking Age
Short films directed by Friz Freleng
Films scored by Milt Franklyn
Prince Valiant
Bugs Bunny films
Yosemite Sam films
1960s English-language films